David Hewson (born January 9, 1982) is a former professional Canadian football linebacker who played for the Toronto Argonauts and Winnipeg Blue Bombers of the Canadian Football League.

Early years 
Hewson was born in Winnipeg, Manitoba and played football at Kelvin High School. He went on to the University of Manitoba and was one of the Manitoba Bisons top defenders, playing as starter cornerback from 2001 to 2005. He was named the CIS football Defensive Player of the Week twice in 2001 and played in the 2003 East West Bowl. He graduated with a degree in Human Geography with a minor in Business Management.

Professional career 
Hewson was drafted in the fifth round of the 2005 CFL Draft by the Calgary Stampeders but was released during training camp that year. On November 1, 2005, Hewson was signed by the Toronto Argonauts to the practice roster. He played in 14 regular season games for the Argos in the 2006 CFL season with 11 special team tackles and appeared in both playoff games, collecting two special teams tackles.

In the 2007 CFL season, the Argos released Hewson during training camp and the Winnipeg Blue Bombers signed him to their practice roster on September 12. He dressed for four games in September and October.

References 

1982 births
Living people
Canadian football people from Winnipeg
Players of Canadian football from Manitoba
Canadian football linebackers
Toronto Argonauts players